The 1974 United States Senate election in Illinois took place on November 5, 1974. Incumbent Democratic U.S. Senator Adlai Stevenson III, who was first elected in a special election in 1970, was re-elected to a full term in office, defeating Republican George Burditt by a large margin of nearly 800,000 votes.

Election information
The primaries (held March 19) and general elections coincided with those for House and those for state offices.

Turnout
Turnout in the primary elections was 24.88%, with a total of 1,502,852 votes cast.

Turnout during the general election was 49.35%, with 2,914,666 votes cast.

Democratic primary

Candidates
 Adlai Stevenson III, incumbent U.S. Senator since 1970
 Walter Dakin Williams, candidate for Senate in 1972 and brother of playwright Tennessee Williams

Results

Republican primary

Candidates
 George Burditt, attorney and former State Representative
 Lar "America First" Daly, perennial candidate

Results

General election

Results

See also 
 1974 United States Senate elections

References

1974
Illinois
United States Senate